Manushulu Marali is a 1969 Indian Telugu-language drama film directed by V. Madhusudhana Rao, starring Shoban Babu and Sharada. The film was a remake of the Malayalam film Thulabharam.

Cast
 Sobhan Babu
 Sharada
 Haranath
 Kanchana
 Gummadi
 Krishnam Raju

Soundtrack

 "Amma Amma Kanumoosava" (Singer: Ghantasala)
 "Aruna Pathaakam Yegirindhi Karmikalokam Gelichindhi" (7
 "Bhoomatha Eenadu" (Singers: P. Susheela and P. Leela)
 "Cheekatilo Kaaru Cheekatilo" (Singer: Ghantasala)
 "Holiday Jollyday'' (Singers: S. P. Balasubrahmanyam, B. Vasantha and P. Susheela)
 "Marali Marali Manushulu Marali" (Singer: T. M. Sounderarajan)
 "Papayi Navvali Pandage Ravali Maa Inta Kuravali Panneeru" (Singers: S. P. Balasubrahmanyam and P. Susheela; Cast: Shoban Babu and Sharada)
 "Toorupu Sindhoorapu Mandarapu Vannelalo Udayaragam" (Singers: S. P. Balasubrahmanyam and P. Susheela; Cast: Haranath and Kanchana)

Box office
The film ran for more than 100 days in 5 centres (Vijayawada, Warangal, Rajahmundry, Hyderabad and Secunderabad) in Andhra Pradesh. It has completed Silver Jubilee celebrations.

References

External links
 Manushulu Marali film at IMDb.
 Listen to Manushulu Marali songs at Music India Online.com

1969 films
1960s Telugu-language films
Films directed by V. Madhusudhana Rao
Films scored by K. V. Mahadevan
Telugu remakes of Malayalam films
Gemini Studios films